Sikander Ali Malik (born 16 December 1985 in Nottingham, England) is a British actor who plays Asa (Acer) Anwar in the BBC One drama Doctors and is best known for portraying Jamil Fadel in the soap operas Hollyoaks, Hollyoaks Later and the online prequel Hollyoaks: Freshers.

Career 

Sikander has recently been filming for the BBC and was the guest lead in the BBC One drama Doctors. His character Asa (Acer) Anwar was introduced in the episode titled Desperately Seeking Melanie (aired 4 October 2012).

As well as appearing on television, Sikander has been busy filming for the lead role of Thomas in a new independent romantic comedy titled Next Time We Get A Taxi currently in post production and due to be shown at the National Gallery in London in 2012.

Sikander also appeared in the 2007 film Rocky Balboa directed by Sylvester Stallone.

Charity work

Sikander regularly participates and is actively involved in aiding and spreading the word for many different causes and charitable organisations such as Save The Family, OXFAM, Zoe's Place Baby Hospice, and the NHS Blood and Transplant unit (NHSBT).

On 28 November 2010, Sikander was invited by Save The Family to switch the Christmas lights on for homeless children in Northop Hall, Flintshire, Wales. Save the Family is an organisation dedicated to providing shelter and support to homeless families to rebuild their lives while being given the chance to stay together.

On 13 February 2012, Sikander was spearheading part of a campaign by the NHS Blood and Transplant Unit (NHSBT) to urge more members of the Black and Asian community to consider donating blood and organ donation.

Meeting and speaking with members of the public at Highcross Shopping Centre in Leicester, Sikander helped persuade more than 360 people to join the organ donor register: "There is a lack of Asian and black donors out there... and they're waiting much longer than anybody else for an organ transplant... if you're a patient from an ethnic background you need an organ from a similar a community, otherwise it could be rejected."

Television and film credits

References

External links
 
 

1985 births
Living people
English male television actors
Alumni of King's College London
Actors from Nottingham
Male actors from Nottinghamshire